Russell John Ohlsen (born 1 December 1955) is a former Australian rules footballer who played for Carlton and Collingwood in the VFL during the late 1970s and early 1980s.

A utility, Ohlsen was used mostly as a ruck-rover but could also tag opposition players. After a dispute with Carlton he successfully sought a clearance and crossed to Collingwood in 1979. In Ohlsen's brief career at Collingwood he played in losing Grand Finals in his first two seasons.

References

External links

Blueseum Profile: Russell Ohlsen

1955 births
Living people
Australian rules footballers from Victoria (Australia)
Carlton Football Club players
Collingwood Football Club players
Maryborough Football Club players